Marshall is a city in and the county seat of Clark County, Illinois, United States, located approximately  west of Terre Haute, Indiana.  The population was 3,947 at the 2020 census.

History
Marshall was officially organized by William B. Archer in 1835, eight years after the National Road entered the community. The city was named after John Marshall, chief justice of the U.S. Supreme Court. Marshall was incorporated on May 14, 1873.

In 1863, Marshall was the scene of conflict in which local Copperheads, who opposed the Civil War, sought to protect soldiers who had deserted from the Union Army. In March, 1863, an army detail from Indiana arrested several deserters. A local judge, Charles H. Constable, freed the deserters and ordered the arrest of two Union sergeants on kidnapping charges. This resulted in the dispatch of 250 soldiers under the command of Col. Henry B. Carrington by special train from Indianapolis, who surrounded the courthouse, freed the sergeants and arrested judge Charles H. Constable. The judge was, however, absolved several months later after presenting a highly technical defense.

Marshall was home to the Handy Writers' Colony, 1950–1964. The most famous writer associated with the Colony was the novelist James Jones, who built a home in Marshall and lived there ca. 1952–1957.

Geography

Demographics

As of the 2020 census there were 3,947 people, 1,627 households, and 1,129 families residing in the city. The racial makeup of the city was 93.06% White, 0.63% African American, 0.25% Native American, 0.89% Asian, 1.49% from other races, and 3.67% from two or more races. Hispanic or Latino of any race were 3.34% of the population.

There were 1,627 households, out of which 41.49% had children under the age of 18 living with them, 43.82% were married couples living together, 20.34% had a female householder with no husband present, and 30.61% were non-families. 23.36% of all households were made up of individuals, and 13.95% had someone living alone who was 65 years of age or older. The average household size was 2.49 and the average family size was 2.17.

The city's age distribution consisted of 21.4% under the age of 18, 8.5% from 18 to 24, 22.1% from 25 to 44, 23.4% from 45 to 64, and 24.7% who were 65 years of age or older. The median age was 42.9 years. For every 100 females, there were 83.0 males. For every 100 females age 18 and over, there were 81.6 males.

The median income for a household in the city was $51,201, and the median income for a family was $65,387. Males had a median income of $40,613 versus $32,910 for females. The per capita income for the city was $29,448. About 12.5% of families and 10.9% of the population were below the poverty line, including 14.8% of those under age 18 and 2.0% of those age 65 or over.

Economy
The downtown district is centered on the county courthouse. The town's major employer, TRW Automotive, operates an automotive electronics manufacturing facility, employing a thousand area residents.  Marshall is the site of the oldest continually operated hotel in Illinois, the Archer House.

Arts and culture
Every autumn Marshall holds a Fall Festival.

The Marshall post office contains an oil on canvas mural, Harvest, painted in 1938 by Miriam McKinnie. Murals were produced from 1934 to 1943 in the United States through the Section of Painting and Sculpture, later called the Section of Fine Arts, of the Treasury Department.

Government 
The City of Marshall City Council consists of nine members: eight aldermen and the mayor.  Current officeholders are: 
John Hasten, Mayor (term expires 2025);
Bob Nelson, Alderman Ward 1 (term expires 2025);
Foster Propst, Alderman Ward 1 (term expires 2023);
Vickie Wallace, Alderman Ward 2 (term expires 2021);
Michael Smitley, Alderman Ward 2 (term expires 2025);
Jarod Green, Alderman Ward 3 (term expires 2025);
Warren LeFever, Alderman Ward 3 (term expires 2023);
Joshua Sanders, Alderman Ward 4 (term expires 2023);
Logan Sanders, Alderman Ward 4 (term expires 2021).

Notable people

 Robert H. Birch, American western outlaw, raised in Marshall, IL
 Ed Carpenter, IndyCar Series driver, 2013 Indy pole sitter; raised in Marshall, IL
 Charles H. Constable, Attorney, Illinois State Senator, Judge, and real estate entrepreneur; close friend of Abraham Lincoln; lived in Marshall
 Walter E. Cork,  Illinois state representative and businessman, lived in Marshall
 Gerald Forsythe, businessman and auto racing magnate; owner of Forsythe Championship Racing; born in Marshall
 James Jones, novelist, lived in Marshall ca. 1952-1957
 John W. Lewis Jr., politician; born in Marshall
 Ed Mayer, third baseman in Major League Baseball for the Philadelphia Phillies; born in Marshall
 John Scholfield, jurist and state legislator; lived in Marshall
 Jacob Zimmerman, United States Representative, newspaper editor, and businessman; lived in Marshall

References

External links
 City of Marshall Illinois Official Website
 Marshall, Illinois History at GenealogyTrails.com
 Marshall, Illinois City-Data.com

Cities in Clark County, Illinois
County seats in Illinois
Populated places established in 1835